La France a un incroyable talent: La Bataille Du Jury aired from June 23, 2020 to July 14, 2020 as a spin-off to the main show, La France a un incroyable talent. Éric Antoine, Hélène Ségara, Marianne James and Sugar Sammy all returned as judges. David Ginola returned as the TV presenter of the show. Each judge chose a team of six contestants, which included five contestants from previous seasons of La France a un incroyable talent and one contestant from an international version of the series, including acts from Britain's Got Talent and America's Got Talent. The winner of the season and the €100,000 prize was motorcyclist Kenny Thomas from team Hélène Ségara. The runner-up was improvisational comedic singer Thomas Boissy from team Éric Antoine.

Contestant Overview 
The season featured 24 different acts, 23 of which had previously competed on either La France a un incroyable talent, America's Got Talent or Britain's Got Talent. These acts included previous winners, runner-ups, finalists and semifinalists. One act, Red Devils (on team Marianne James), had not previously competed on any Got Talent show.

The Duels 
The first round of the season featured duels between two acts from different teams. After both performances, the audience and the two judges who did not have acts from their team competing in the duel would vote on which act should move on to the next round. Each of these three voting parties would count for one-third of the total vote. Whichever act received the majority of the votes would remain in the competition, and the opposing act would be eliminated. 12 out of 24 acts advanced to the next round.

Episode 1

Episode 2

Episode 3

The Finals 
The second round of the season featured six more duels between two different acts, who were selected at random. These duels did not require the acts competing against each other to be from separate teams. After both performances, the audience and the two judges who did not have acts from their team competing in the duel would vote on which act should move on to the final six and have the opportunity to win the Battle of the Judges and the €100,000 prize. Each of these three voting parties would count for one-third of the total vote. Whichever act received the majority of the votes would remain in the competition, and the opposing act would be eliminated. 6 out of 12 acts advanced to the next round.

In the event that a duel featured two acts from the same team competing against each other, after both performances the audience and the three judges who did not have acts from their team competing in the duel would vote on which act should move on to the final six. Each of these four voting parties would count for one-fourth of the total vote. Whichever act received the majority of the votes would remain in the competition, and the opposing act would be eliminated.

Episode 4

Final 6 
The third and final round of the season featured the acts who won the previous six duels in the finals. Based on their performances from the previous round, the audience voted for the act that they thought deserved to win the competition. The winner of the season was motorcyclist Kenny Thomas from team Hélène Ségara. He received the €100,000 prize. The runner-up was improvisational comedic singer Thomas Boissy from team Éric Antoine, and the act finishing in third place was pole acrobat Rémi Martin from team Marianne James.

Final Results

References 

French-language television shows
2020s French television seasons
France